Vladimir Stanislavovich Kachalsky ((March 1, 1956) is a Soviet and Russian painter, graphic artist and printmaker, book artist, author of installations and sculptural objects.

Biography 

Studied in the studio under the guidance of Y. V. Dimakov (1962–1964). Studied in the studio of his father, artist S. B. Kachalsky; Secondary Art School named after Ioganson (1967–1974). Graduated from the Institute of Painting, Sculpture and Architecture named after I.Y. Repin, V. A. Vetrogonsky's studio (1979–1985). Member of Saint Petersburg Union of Artists (since 1990).

Over recent years, he has been occupied with private interior design, fresco wall painting, colour relief.
The artist works in printed graphic technics: lithography, etching, serigraphy, and linocut.

Participant of numerous group exhibitions in Russia and abroad (since 1981). Including: Great Exhibition of the Land of Nord-Westphalia (Dusseldorf, Germany, 1989); ArtJunction (Nice, France, 1991); International Fair (Barcelona, Spain, 1991); Abu Dhabi (United Arab Emirates, 1992); St. Petersburg today (Mandel, Stavanger, Norway, 1992); Irina Nevska Gallery (San Francisco, USA, 1994); Biennial of Graphic Art (Kaliningrad, 1992, 1994); Retrospective exhibition of Russian art (Zeeland, Domburg, Holland, 1994) Solo exhibitions: Intersot (1993); St. Petersburg Union of Artists (1995); Chelyabinsk (1995).
Project member: City as an Artist's Subjectivity (2020).

The artist lives and makes art in his workshop at the Benois House (St. Petersburg), and in Tallinn since 2022 (Estonia).

Museum collections
The artist's works are in the following museum collections/ State Catalogue of the Museum Fund of Russiaa:

 Russian Museum. Department of engraving XVIII-XXI centuries. (St. Petersburg)
 National Library of Russia. Department of Prints (St. Petersburg)
 Pushkin Museum. Science Library/ Rare Books Dept. (Moscow)
 P.M. Dogadin Astrakhan State Art Gallery. (Astrakhan)
 Mandal Museum (Mandal, Norway)
 Chelyabinsk State Museum of Fine Arts. (Chelyabinsk)
 Municipal Budgetary Institution Art Gallery. Republic of Tatarstan (Zelenodolsk).
 Museum-Reserve Shushenskoye. (Shushenskoye)

Bibliography
 Parygin Alexey A City as an Artist's Subjectivity / Artist’s Book Yearbook 2022-2023. Edited by Sarah Bodman. — Bristol: CFPR (Centre for Fine Print Research). University of the West of England, 2022. — 292 pp. 
 Погарский М., Лукин В. Ф. Энциклопедия Книги художника. М. — 2022. цв. ил. — 296 с. — С. 164. 
 Кононихин Н. Ленинградская школа литографии. Путь длиною в век. СПб: М. Frants Art Foundation. — 2021. — 360 с., цв. ил. 
 Alexey Parygin A City as the Artist's Subjectivity // Book Arts Newsletter. — No. 140. Bristol: CFPR (Centre for Fine Print Research). University of the West of England, 2021, July–August. — pp. 46–48. ISSN 1754-9086
 Печатная графика Санкт-Петербургских художников // Каталог. Авт. вст. ст.: Н. Ю. Кононихин, А. Б. Парыгин. СПб: СПб СХ. — 2020. — 192 с., цв. ил. 
 City as Artist's subjectivity. Artist's book project. Catalog. Authors of the articles: Parygin A.B., Markov T.A., Klimova E.D., Borovsky A.D., Severyukhin D.Ya., Grigoryants E.I., Blagodatov N.I. (Rus & En) — Saint Petersburg: Ed. T. Markova. 2020. — 128 p. 
 Рисунок Санкт-Петербургских художников / Каталог выставки в СПбСХ. Авт. вст. ст.: Л. Н. Вострецова. СПб: ООО Таро. — 2019. — 148 с., цв. ил. — С. 62.

Gallery of works

References

External links
 

1956 births
Year of death missing
20th-century Russian painters
21st-century Russian painters
Russian male painters
Russian printmakers
Russian illustrators
Soviet painters
Artists from Saint Petersburg
Residents of the Benois House
Repin Institute of Arts alumni